Petertide (also known as St Peter's Tide) refers to the Sunday nearest to St Peter's Day on 29 June and to the period around that day.

In Anglicanism, Petertide is the major one of two traditional periods for the ordination of new priests (the other being Michaelmas, around 29 September).

Around Penzance in west Cornwall, the period has long been celebrated by Midsummer bonfires and sometimes the burning of effigies of unpopular residents.

See also

 Golowan Festival

References

Christian Sunday observances
June observances
Cornish culture